The Tucson Saguaros are a professional baseball team based in Tucson, Arizona, that began play in 2016. The club is a member of the Pecos League, an independent baseball league which is not affiliated with Major League Baseball or Minor League Baseball.

History

Announced in November 2015 as an expansion franchise, Tucson began play in the 2016 season. The team played its home games Thursday through Sunday at Cherry Field.  The team played neutral site home games Monday through Wednesday in Winslow at Vargas Field.

The team's home field was Kino Veterans Memorial Stadium for the 2016 and 2017 seasons with the exception of Sunday games, which were played at Warren Ballpark in Bisbee. The Saguaros moved to Reid Park Field #5 at the beginning of the 2018 season for Thursday through Sunday games, but then moved to Cherry Field on July 4, 2018.

The team conducted Spring Training at Pascua Yaqui Pueblo Park on the Pascua Pueblo Yaqui Reservation. Spring Training was also conducted at Reid Park Field #5 starting in 2018, where they were joined by the Ruidoso Osos. They are known colloquially as the "Cactus Crew".

2016: Inaugural season and a Pecos League championship

The team began signing players for its first season in winter preparing for opening of its training camp in May.

The Saguaros opened their inaugural season 6–0, sweeping the Santa Fe Fuego in a four-game series. In a high-scoring 22–12 victory on May 25, 2016, against the White Sands Pupfish in Alamogordo, New Mexico, the Saguaros had 29 hits and four home runs, one of which was hit by the starting pitcher, Carlos Diaz.

On July 4, 2016, the Saguaros broke the all-time Pecos League record by drawing 8,720 fans to their contest against Roswell, an 8–4 Invaders win.

On August 11, 2016, the Saguaros became the 2016 Pecos League champions by defeating the Trinidad Triggers 2 games to 0 in a 5–4 victory. Entering the bottom of the ninth inning, the Trinidad Triggers were leading 4–1. Catcher Jesse Baker scored the winning run in the bottom of the ninth when Christian Schneider threw a wild pitch to pinch hitter Thomas McKenna. The Saguaros set a Pecos League record with 51 wins in a season.

2017: Best record in Pecos League

Kirby Campbell was announced as the new manager on October 12, 2016, while the previous manager, J.D. Droddy, remained on the Saguaros as the Director of Player Procurement until becoming the manager of the Salina Stockade (baseball) of the American Association of Independent Professional Baseball. Campbell, a 2014 graduate of the University of Arkansas at Pine Bluff, began the 2016 season as the starting first baseman of the Great Bend Boom and became Great Bend's manager midway through the season. Five players returned from the inaugural season: pitchers Brandon Cook, Jake Eaton, and Matt Kelley, as well as outfielders Burnell Dailey, and Thomas McKenna. The Saguaros finished the season with the best record in the Pecos League, 46–11, but they lost in the playoffs to the High Desert Yardbirds 2–1 in the Pacific Division series.

2018: Move to Reid Park and Cherry Field

The Saguaros moved from the Pacific Division to the Southern Division in 2018. The team also moved their home field to Gene C. Reid Park Field #5. Bill Moore, a resident of Mesa was announced as the new manager on December 16, 2017. He had originally considered taking the job in 2016. Ryan Retz, a Canyon del Oro High School graduate and Pecos League All-Star in 2016 for the Saguaros, returned after a one-year hiatus from the team. Left-handed pitcher Ryan Baca and infielder Kevin Baron returned from the previous year. The Saguaros played a Spring Training game against the Ruidoso Osos at Reid Park Field #5 on May 20, 2018. It was the first time the team had played a Spring Training game against another team. On July 4, 2018, the Saguaros moved to Cherry Field since it had lights so that home games could be played at night and start later at 7:00 P.M.

2019: Full season at Cherry Field

The Saguaros moved back to the Pacific Division in 2019. On December 8, 2018, Bill Rogan, from Denver was named the new manager. He worked for the Colorado Rockies Specialty Ticket Sales. 2018 Pecos League All-Star outfielder Lawrence Chavez was the only returning player from the previous year.

2020: Delayed season in Houston and Second Pecos League championship

Due to the COVID-19 pandemic, the season was delayed to start on July 1, 2020, with all games to be played at Coastal Park in Houston, Texas. The Saguaros moved to the Central Division. On August 25, 2020, the Saguaros became the 2020 Pecos League champions by defeating the Salina Stockade 2 games to 0.

2021: Amphitheater High School and Third Pecos League championship

The Saguaros moved to the Mountain South Division in 2021 and played home games at Amphitheater High School, winning their third Pecos League championship.

2022: Return to Kino Stadium

After playing home games at smaller stadiums for the previous few years, the Saguaros returned to Kino Veterans Memorial Stadium. They returned to the Pacific Division this year.

Roster

Season-by-season results

Team firsts
First Game: vs Santa Fe Fuego, 11–4 win (5/19/2016)
First Hit: Burnell Dailey, (5/19/2016)
First Home Run: Adam Urbania, (5/19/2016)
First Winning Pitcher: David Contreras (5/19/2016)
First Save: Daniel Hurtado (5/21/2016)

Individual awards

Pecos League MVP
 2020 – Nathan Etheridge

Pecos League Pitcher of the Year
 2016 – Steven Borkowski
 2020 – Cody Earl

Pecos League Pacific Division Pitcher of the Year
 2017 – Clay Miller

Pecos League Southern Division Pitcher of the Year
 2018 – Skylar Sylvester

Pecos League Mountain Division Pitcher of the Year
 2021 – Auggie Martinez

Pecos League Pacific Division Hitter of the Year
 2017 – Fernando Garza

Pecos League Southern Division Hitter of the Year
 2018 – Austin Hoffman

Pecos League Offensive Player of the Year
 2020 – Chris Caffrey

Pecos League Mountain Division Offensive Player of the Year
 2021 – Gabe Wurtz

Pecos League Mountain Division Manager of the Year
 2021 – Sean McNeill

Pecos League All-Star
 Adam Urbania (2016)
 David Robles (2016)
 Jesse Baker (2016)
 Michael Morris (2016)
 Ryan Retz (2016)
 Steven Borkowski (2016)
 Brandon Cook (2017)
 Clay Miller (2017)
 Darryl Baca (2017)
 Eric Morell (2017)
 Fernando Garza (2017)
 Frank Trimarco (2017)
 Kevin Baron (2017, 2018)
 Matt Kelley (2017)
 Nicholas Vitale (2017)
 Thomas McKenna (2017)
 Tre Porter (2017)
 Zack Gonzalez (2017)
 Austin Hoffman (2018)
 Billy Damon (2018)
 Charlie Padilla (2018)
 Jaquese Moore (2018)
 Kevin Carr (2018)
 Lawrence Chavez (2018, 2019)
 Skylar Sylvester (2018)
 Tatum Hendrix (2018)
 Willie Ethington (2018)
 Evan Douglas (2019)
 Joe Rivera (2019)
 Michael Klein (2019)
 Patrick Clifford (2019)
 Riley Richarz (2019)
 Robby Medel (2019)
 Will Morris (2019)
 Augie Martinez (2021)
 Christian Naccari (2021)
 Danny Kerr (2021)
 Gabe Wurtz (2021)
 Jeff Serin (2021)
 Jesse Palafox (2021)
 Kokko Figueiredo (2021)
 Leo Gallegos (2021)
 Neil Taylor (2021)

Single season records

Batting
 Games: Burnell Dailey, 65 (2016), Thomas McKenna, 65 (2016), Ryan Retz, 65 (2016)
 Batting average: Thomas DeBonville, .455 (2020)
 On-base percentage: Kokko Figueiredo, .524 (2021)
 Slugging percentage: Gabe Wurtz, .841 (2021)
 At bats: Ryan Retz, 281 (2016)
 Runs: Ryan Retz, 73 (2016)
 Doubles: Austin Hoffman, 22 (2018), Gabe Wurtz, 22 (2021)
 Triples: Ryan Retz, 7 (2016)
 Home runs: Gabe Wurtz, 22 (2021)
 RBI: Gabe Wurtz, 86 (2021)
 Walks: Lawrence Chavez, 70 (2019)
 Strikeouts: Burnell Dailey, 64 (2016)
 Stolen bases: Ryan Retz, 42 (2016)
 Hits: Michael Morris, 98 (2016)

Pitching
 Earned run average: Redmond Floyd, 1.12 (2017)
 Win–loss percentage: Steven Borkowski, 1.000 (2016), Clay Miller, 1.000 (2017), Eric Morell, 1.000 (2017)
 WHIP: Tyler Herr, .550 (2016)
 Games: David Robles, 29 (2016)
 Saves: Joe Rivera, 9 (2019)
 Innings: Steven Borkowski, 79.1 (2016)
 Strikeouts: Steven Borkowski, 92 (2016)
 Complete games: Billy Damon, 5 (2018)
 Walks allowed: Steven Borkowski, 46 (2016)
 Hits allowed: Will Morris, 84 (2019)
 Wins: Steven Borkowski, 10 (2016)
 Losses: Will Morris, 4 (2019), Kris Keach, 4 (2019), Austin Cooper, 4 (2019)
 Earned runs allowed: Cameron Cox, 43 (2016)

Fielding
 Putouts: Ryan Retz, 506 (2016)
 Assists: Michael Morris, 167 (2016)
 Fielding average by an infielder: Jesse Baker, .995 (2016)
 Fielding average by an outfielder: Jay Stout, 1.000 (2018)

References

External links
 Tucson Saguaros website

Pecos League teams
Professional baseball teams in Arizona
Baseball teams established in 2015
2015 establishments in Arizona
Sports in Tucson, Arizona